Phthisis may refer to:

Mythology
 Phthisis (mythology), Classical/Greco-Roman personification of rot, decay and putrefaction

Medical terms
 Phthisis bulbi, shrunken, nonfunctional eye
 Phthisis miliaris, miliary tuberculosis
 Phthisis pulmonalis, tuberculosis, also known as consumption